George Thomas Dungate Topping (27 August 1881 – 17 November 1958) was an Australian rules footballer and umpire in the Victorian Football League.

Playing career

Originally recruited from Carlton Juniors, Topping made his debut for the Carlton Football Club in Round 10 of the 1902 season. Playing mainly in the forward line he was a good mark and accurate kick with a good sense of where to go to get the ball. His firepower was vital in Carlton's hat-trick of premierships from 1906 to 1908 with totals of 25, 26 and 16 goals in those  respective seasons. The following year the Blues were just beaten by South Melbourne in the grand final but Topping had his best scoring year with a total of 36 goals and playing in every match.

The following the season the sides met in round four. It was a spiteful affair with fights erupting at regular intervals. Late in the final quarter South Melbourne defender Bert Streckfuss felled, struck unconscious.

Field umpire, Lardie Tulloch promptly reported Topping, who was escorted from the ground by Carlton supporters who were either showing their support or for his own protection.

At the subsequent tribunal hearing, Topping admitted that he had lost his head and struck Streckfuss in retaliation for Streckfuss's previous elbowing of Andy McDonald. The tribunal took a dim view of the incident and suspended Topping for the remainder of the 1910 season and all of 1911.

There were further repercussions for both Topping and Streckfuss when they were called before the Carlton Court a fortnight later charged with assault. Found guilty, the bench decided to set an example and both were fined the maximum  £10, in default three months imprisonment.

Topping returned for a single game in 1912, kicking Carlton's opening goal of the season and two more for the match. During the following week he sustained an injury and was not selected for round 2. Still on crutches in May, he took no further part in the season.

Following an unsuccessful foray into umpiring Topping rejoined the Blues for 1914 kicking three goal against Melbourne in round one. The next week against Geelong he turned awkwardly after taking a mark and dislocated a bone in his ankle. He hobbled through remainder of the game but his season ended with the final siren.

Reappearing in round two 1916 he kicked two goals and the next week against Richmond his final goal in his 125th and last match.

Umpiring career

Injured in 1912 Topping applied to become a field umpire with the VFL. He was accepted and placed on the senior list. Initially appointed to a number of country matches his first VFL appointment was Fitzroy v. Essendon in round five. He became the 67th field umpire in VFL history. The match seems to have been well enough handled, The Argus only critical of an advantage called back costing Essendon a goal. The Football record noted 'He severely penalised anyone holding the ball when caught.'

In rounds seven and eight – played on the Saturday and Monday – he umpired both Essendon matches with seemingly few issues yet they were his final senior appointments. By July he was reported as back at Carlton having not been a success in umpiring although the Football record intimated Topping missed playing more than he expected noting, "Topping has had a go at field umpiring, and has come to the conclusion that it is better to play than to see that the other fellows play the game according to Hoyle."

Seven years after his last match as a player Topping again applied to join the VFL umpires and again was accepted. This time he stuck at it for longer and, despite not achieving senior matches, was more successful. His 15 VCFL matches in 1922 included two finals – the Heathcote grand final and the Peninsula Football Association second semi-final – and he returned the same total in 1923 with two more finals.

Two matches in 1924 a month apart suggest the possibility of injury ending Topping's career with the whistle. His final totals were 3 VFL and 38 VCFL appointments.

References

External links

 George Topping at Blueseum

1881 births
Carlton Football Club players
Carlton Football Club Premiership players
Australian Football League umpires
Australian rules footballers from Melbourne
1958 deaths
Three-time VFL/AFL Premiership players